Ezekiel 5 is the fifth chapter of the Book of Ezekiel in the Hebrew Bible or the Old Testament of the Christian Bible. This book contains the prophecies attributed to the prophet/priest Ezekiel, and is one of the Prophetic Books. This chapter contains the prophecies using the division of the prophet's shaved hair as a sign (Ezekiel 5:1-4), showing God's judgment upon Jerusalem (verses 5–11), by pestilence, by famine, by the sword, and by dispersion (verses 12–17). The siege is described again in chapter 6.

Text
The original text was written in the Hebrew language. This chapter is divided into 17 verses.

Textual witnesses
Some early manuscripts containing the text of this chapter in Hebrew are of the Masoretic Text, which includes the Codex Cairensis (895), the Petersburg Codex of the Prophets (916), Aleppo Codex (10th century), Codex Leningradensis (1008). Fragments containing parts of this chapter were found among the Dead Sea Scrolls including 
1Q9 (1QEzek; Pre 68 CE) with the extant verse 1; and 11Q4 (11QEzek; 50 BCE–50 CE) with extant verses 11–17.

There is also a translation into Koine Greek known as the Septuagint, made in the last few centuries BC. Extant ancient manuscripts of the Septuagint version include Codex Vaticanus (B; B; 4th century), Codex Alexandrinus (A; A; 5th century) and Codex Marchalianus (Q; Q; 6th century).

The outcome of the siege (5:1–4)
This section records the 'third acted prophecy of siege' to depict the fate of the people under siege. Isaiah has prophesied over a century earlier that 'Judah would be shaved by the razor of Assyria'. Ezekiel is to act out the prophecy, giving it a fresh meaning for its fulfilment in the immediate future.

Verse 1
 "And you, son of man, take a sharp sword, take it as a barber's razor, and pass it over your head and your beard; then take scales to weigh and divide the hair."
 "Son of man" (Hebrew: בן־אדם -): this phrase is used 93 times to address Ezekiel. 
 "Razor": to depict "military defeat".
Methodist commentator Joseph Benson notes that hair was "then accounted an ornament, and baldness a token of sorrow, therefore shaving denoted calamity or desolation". It was contrary to Leviticus 21:5 for a Jewish priest to cut his hair or shave his beard:
Speak to the priests, the sons of Aaron, and say to them: ... 'They shall not make any bald place on their heads, nor shall they shave the edges of their beards nor make any cuttings in their flesh'.

Verse 3
"You shall also take a small number of them [his hair] and bind them in the edge of your garment."
This small number symbolises the remnant of the people of Judah who survived.

The meaning of the siege signs (5:5–17)
Having described the complete disaster that would soon befall the besieged city, the identity of the city is finally revealed to be Jerusalem (verse 5). It is followed by the reason for the prophecies (verses 5–6a) and God's judgements for the city (verses 8ff).

See also
Jerusalem
Son of man
Related Bible parts: Ezekiel 3, Ezekiel 4, Ezekiel 6

Notes

References

Sources

External links

Jewish
Ezekiel 5 Hebrew with Parallel English
Ezekiel 5 Hebrew with Rashi's Commentary

Christian
Ezekiel 5 English Translation with Parallel Latin Vulgate

05